Sabarimala Sree Dharmashastha is a 1970 Indian Malayalam-language film,  directed by M. Krishnan Nair and produced by C. R. K. Nair. The film stars Thikkurissy Sukumaran Nair, Hari, Manavalan Joseph and Sridevi. The film had musical score by V. Dakshinamoorthy and Jaya Vijaya.

Cast
Thikkurissy Sukumaran Nair
Hari
Manavalan Joseph
Sridevi
T. S. Muthaiah
Ambika
Kottarakkara Sreedharan Nair
Padmini
Ragini
S. P. Pillai

Soundtrack
The music was composed by V. Dakshinamoorthy and Jaya Vijaya and the lyrics were written by M. P. Sivam, Bhoothanadha Sarvaswam, P. Bhaskaran, Vayalar Ramavarma, Traditional, Sankaracharyar, K. Narayanapilla and Sreekumaran Thampi.

References

External links
 

1970 films
1970s Malayalam-language films
Films directed by M. Krishnan Nair
Films scored by Jaya Vijaya